René Vignaud (19 January 1893 – 18 October 1969) was a French runner. He competed in the 3000 m event at the 1920 Summer Olympics and finished fourth with the French team. He also took part in the International Cross Country Championships in 1913 and 1920, and won a team bronze medal in 1920.

References

External links
 

1893 births
1969 deaths
French male long-distance runners
Olympic athletes of France
Athletes (track and field) at the 1920 Summer Olympics